The Lohner M was a reconnaissance flying boat produced in small numbers in Austria-Hungary during World War I. It was a two-bay biplane of typical configuration for the flying boats of the day, with its pusher engine mounted on struts in the interplane gap. The pilot and observer sat side by side in an open cockpit, and both the upper and lower sets of wings featured sweepback.

Operators

Austro-Hungarian Navy

Kaiserliche Marine

Specifications (Lohner Mn)

See also

Notes

References

 

1910s Austro-Hungarian military reconnaissance aircraft
M
Flying boats
Military aircraft of World War I
Biplanes
Single-engined pusher aircraft
Aircraft first flown in 1914